Is It Cake? is a 2022 game show style cooking competition television series created by Dan Cutforth and Jane Lipsitz, and hosted by Mikey Day. The series premiered on Netflix on March 18, 2022. Contestants create cakes that replicate common objects in an effort to trick celebrity judges. Winners of each episode receive $5,000 and a chance to win more money by identifying which display of cash is real and which is cake.

The series is based on the viral internet meme of the same name, popularized on YouTube and TikTok. As a part of the trend, a common object or food is disguised as cake and others are tasked to determine which is real. Day was introduced to the trend by his manager Michael Goldman, to which he was fascinated by. Although Day had no baking experience or background, he took on role of host. Day explained the draw of show piqued the "human desire ... to pick out the 'disguised something.'"

In June 2022, Netflix renewed the series for a second season.

Gameplay 
Throughout each episode, contestants and celebrity judges are presented with multiples of an object, with a cake replicating that object presented amongst the real objects. Three contestants are able to compete by baking a cake within eight hours which actually replicates the look of an object selected for that episode. Celebrity judges are then presented with three separate sets of objects presented themselves in sets of five of the same object. Amongst each set of five is one cake baked that day by one of the contestants. If the judges correctly guess which object is actually a cake, that contestant is eliminated from that episode. When multiple contestants are able to trick the judges, the judges then select a winner based on quality of the cake to break the tie. The winner of each episode wins $5,000 and is able to win an additional $5,000 if they can correctly identify between a visually identical pair of bundles of cash which is actually a cake. If they do not correctly identify the cake, the $5,000 is added to the cash bundle round winnings in the next episode. The winners of the three episodes leading up to the finale then compete in the finale to win $50,000. The show does not eliminate any of the eight contestants and they are able to stay throughout the season and observe even if they are not competing in that episode. Some not competing in the finale were selected to help support the finalists' baking efforts.

Production 
Is It Cake? was created by Dan Cutforth and Jane Lipsitz and is produced by their company, Alfred Street Industries. It is hosted by Mikey Day. On June 2, 2022, the series was renewed for a second season.

Episodes

Release 
Is It Cake? was released on Netflix on March 18, 2022.

See also 

 Bake Squad
 Baking Impossible
 Nailed It!

References

External links 

 
 

2022 American television series debuts
2020s American game shows
2020s American reality television series
English-language Netflix original programming
Media about cakes
Food reality television series